Enlarged Erie Canal Historic District (Discontiguous) is a national historic district located at Cohoes in Albany County, New York. It includes two contributing buildings and 10 contributing structures.  It encompasses resources associated with the Enlarged Erie Canal, 1835–1862, Locks 9 through 18, and located within the City of Cohoes. The district includes five numbered units with each unit representing a cohesive grouping of resources highlighted by one or more extant canal locks.  Each unit consists of at least one remaining lock and the associated elements including sections of towpath, berm walls, engineering features, and canal prism.

 Unit 1: Lock 9
 Unit 2: Lock 10
 Unit 3: Locks 14 and 15
 Unit 4: Lock 17
 Unit 5: Lock 18
It was listed on the National Register of Historic Places in 2004.

Gallery

References

Erie Canal parks, trails, and historic sites
Historic districts on the National Register of Historic Places in New York (state)
Historic districts in Albany County, New York
National Register of Historic Places in Albany County, New York